Kung Fu Style is a 2015 Chinese animated action adventure comedy film directed by Xu Kerr. It was released on April 10, 2015.

Voice cast
Huang Ying
Cao Zhen
Zhang Anqi
Li Zhengxiang
Cheng Yuzhu
Hai Fang
Liu Bin
Hu Yi
Meng Xianglong
Ye Lu
Wei Siyun
Wang Jianxin
Zhan Jia

Reception
The film earned  at the Chinese box office.

References

2015 action comedy films
2010s adventure comedy films
Animated action films
Animated adventure films
Animated comedy films
Chinese animated films
Chinese action adventure films
2015 animated films
2010s Mandarin-language films